The River Geirionydd (Afon Geirionydd in Welsh) is a river in Snowdonia, North Wales.  It is a tributary of the River Crafnant (Afon Crafnant), which flows over the Fairy Falls waterfall in Trefriw, and thence on into the River Conwy (Afon Conwy), which is the main river of the Conwy valley.

It flows from Llyn Geirionydd down a steep gorge before joining the river Crafnant. It is less than a mile in length.

The river passes the former Klondyke mill, which used its waters.  Klondyke was a mining and milling complex connected with some of the metal mines of the Gwydir Forest by means of an old tramway which ran alongside Llyn Geirionydd. From above the mill wagons used to enter the building via an aerial ropeway.

The Welsh language poet, clergyman, antiquary and literary critic Evan Evans (1795–1855) was born on a freehold on banks of the river.

References

River Geirionydd
Rivers of Conwy County Borough
Rivers of Snowdonia